{{Speciesbox
| genus = Sphaeralcea
| species = incana
| authority = Torr. ex A.Gray<ref name=itis>[https://www.itis.gov/servlet/SingleRpt/SingleRpt?search_topic=TSN&search_value=21943  Integrated Taxonomic Information System−ITIS Standard Report Page: Sphaeralcea incana]</ref>
| synonyms = 
}}Sphaeralcea incana, with the common names gray globemallow and soft globemallow, is a desert plant in the mallow family (Malvaceae).Native Plant Network: Sphaeralcea incana

Distribution
The plant is native to Chihuahuan Desert and Sonoran Desert ecoregions of the Southwestern United States and northern Mexico. It is found in the states of Arizona, Chihuahua, New Mexico, Sonora, and Texas.

DescriptionSphaeralcea incana is a perennial subshrub with a large taproot. It has several to many erect stems, emerging from a stout woody crown, growing  in height. The gray leaves are very dense with short scurfy hairs.

The flowers are a brilliant orange, appearing from June through October. There are also pink, and white, flowering forms. In some locales the plants can form 'carpets of flowers' after a heavy winter rainy season.

Subspecies
Subspecies include:Sphaeralcea incana ssp. cuneata — soft globemallow — endemic to New Mexico and Arizona. Sphaeralcea incana ssp. incana —  gray globemallow.

Uses
The plant's flowers are of special value to native species of bees and butterflies.

Medicinal plantSphaeralcea incana has been used as a medicinal plant, traditionally by Native Americans, and by others.

The Hopi peoples traditionally used the plant to treat diarrhea.

The leaves and flowers of the plant can be made into an herbal tea used for respiratory irritations and flu.

The roots and leaves are demulcent and emollient. A poultice of fresh crushed leaves has been used for skin injuries or inflammations.

CultivationSphaeralcea incana'' is cultivated as an ornamental plant by specialty plant nurseries. It is used in native plant, water conserving, and wildlife gardens, and for natural landscaping projects.

References

External links
NPIN−Lady Bird Johnson Wildflower Center: Sphaeralcea incana (Gray globemallow)
Wildflower.org: Photos gallery for Gray globemallow

incana
Flora of the Chihuahuan Desert
Flora of the Sonoran Deserts
Flora of Arizona
Flora of Chihuahua (state)
Flora of New Mexico
Flora of Sonora
Flora of Texas
Medicinal plants
Plants used in traditional Native American medicine
Garden plants of North America
Drought-tolerant plants